Badnera railway station serves Badnera, an area in Amravati city in the Indian state of Maharashtra. It is a junction station on the Howrah–Nagpur–Mumbai line. There is a  broad gauge line to Narkhed. Today, Badnera is a part of Amravati Municipal Corporation. City buses are also available from this railway station to many area of Amravati city.  This is one of major junctions on the Mumbai–Howrah railway line. Badnera is crew change point for all goods trains plying Bhusaval–Nagpur line addition to that some Express trains gets crew change here as well. Badnera is last station of Bhusaval Division of Central Railway so, many express trains get slack time here so reached Badnera right time. There is one branch line for Amravati which is for 9 km one of shortest branch lines in India. Badnera, New Amravati railway station are in Amravati Municipal Corporation, so connected well with Amravati city. Trains starting from Amravati to Nagpur does not touch Badnera due chord line which eliminates reversal at Badnera. 51262 Wardha Amravati Passenger halts here for 110minutes, 51198 Wardha Bhusaval Passenger halt here for 85 min which is very rare in Indian Railways in terms of halt time.

History
The first train in India traveled from Mumbai to Thane on 16 April 1853. By May 1854, Great Indian Peninsula Railway's Bombay–Thane line was extended to Kalyan.  Bhusawal railway station was set up in 1860 and in 1867 the GIPR branch line was extended to Nagpur.

Electrification
Railways in the Badnera area were electrified in 1989–91.

Amenities
Amenities at Badnera railway station include: subscriber trunk dialling/public call office booth, waiting room, retiring room, and light refreshment stall.

Gallery

References

External links
Trains at Badnera

Railway stations in Amravati district
Railway junction stations in Maharashtra
Bhusawal railway division
Railway stations opened in 1867
Transport in Amravati